Karl Åke Seyffarth (15 December 1919 – 1 January 1998) was  a Swedish speed skater who specialised in long distance events. He set new world records on the 5,000 m (8:13.7) in 1941 and on the 3000 m (4:45.7) in 1942. He became European Allround Champions in 1947, winning both the 5,000 m and the 10000 m on his way to becoming European Champion. In addition to speed skating, Seyffarth also was one of Sweden's leading cyclists, but this career was hampered by an injury in a dirt biking accident in 1943.

Seyffarth participated in the 1948 Winter Olympics in St. Moritz, the first Winter Olympic Games to be held in twelve years. As a result of the lack of competition during, and shortly after, World War II, Seyffarth entered the 5,000 m as the world record holder, a record he had set almost exactly seven years earlier, in 1941. During his heat, Seyffarth seemed to be winning until a photographer tried to take a picture of him and stepped onto the ice. Seyffarth brushed the photographer, losing several seconds, and went on to lose his heat and finally come in seventh overall. The winner of the race was Reidar Liaklev with a time of 8:29.4, well above Seyffarth's 1941 world record of 8:13.7. Seyffarth's official 5,000 m time was 8:37.9.
 
The day after his disappointing 5000 m race, Seyffarth won Olympic silver on the 1,500 m, half a second behind Norwegian skater Sverre Farstad. The day after that, Seyffarth won Olympic gold on the 10000 m with a time of 17:26.30, not a particularly fast time considering that the world record at the time was 17:01.50. He won with relative ease, however, almost ten seconds ahead of silver medallist Lassi Parkkinen from Finland.

National titles 
Domestically Seyffarth won 22 Single Distance Championships between 1940 and 1948. Note that Sweden did not have any National Allround Championships from 1935 to 1962 – only National Single Distance Championships.

World records 
Over the course of his career, Seyffarth skated two world records:

Source: SpeedSkatingStats.com

Personal records 
To put these personal records in perspective, the column WR lists the official world records on the dates that Seyffarth skated his personal records.

Note that Seyffarth's personal records on the 1000 m and the 3000 m were not recognised as official world records by the International Skating Union.

Seyffarth has an Adelskalender score of 188.678 points. He was number one on the Adelskalender for a total of 3640 days, from 4 February 1942 until 23 January 1952. This long period included World War II – during that war, and for a few years afterwards, very few competitions were held.

Death
Seyffarth died on 1 January 1998, at Mora, Sweden, at the age of 78, 14 days before his 79th birthday and several years after suffering a stroke.

References

External links

IOC profile
Åke Seyffarth at SpeedSkatingStats.com
Evert Stenlund's Adelskalender pages
Historical World Records from the International Skating Union
National Champions from Svenska Skridskoförbundet (the Swedish Skating Association)

1919 births
1998 deaths
Swedish male speed skaters
Olympic speed skaters of Sweden
Olympic gold medalists for Sweden
Olympic silver medalists for Sweden
Speed skaters at the 1948 Winter Olympics
World record setters in speed skating
Olympic medalists in speed skating
Medalists at the 1948 Winter Olympics
World Allround Speed Skating Championships medalists
Sportspeople from Stockholm